Religious syncretism is the blending of religious belief systems into a new system, or the incorporation of other beliefs into a religious tradition. 

This can occur for many reasons, where religious traditions exist in proximity to each other, or when a culture is conquered and the conquerors bring their religious beliefs with them, but do not succeed in eradicating older beliefs and practices.

Many religions have syncretic elements, but adherents often frown upon the application of the label, especially those who belong to "revealed" religions, such as Abrahamic religions, or any system with an exclusivist approach, seeing syncretism as corrupting the original religion. Non-exclusivist systems of belief on the other hand feel freer to incorporate other traditions into their own.

Ancient history 

Classical Athens was exclusive in matters of religion. Some sources assert that the Decree of Diopeithes made the introduction of and belief in foreign gods a criminal offence, and allowed only Greeks to worship in Athenian temples and festivals as foreigners were considered impure. Other sources dispute the existence of the decree.

Syncretism functioned as a feature of Hellenistic Ancient Greek religion, although only outside of Greece. Overall, Hellenistic culture in the age that followed Alexander the Great itself showed syncretist features, essentially blending of Mesopotamian, Persian, Anatolian, Egyptian (and eventually Etruscan–Roman) elements within a Hellenic formula. The Egyptian god Amun developed as the Hellenized Zeus Ammon after Alexander the Great went into the desert to seek out his oracle at Siwa.

The Romans, identifying themselves as common heirs to a very similar civilization, identified Greek deities with similar figures in the Etruscan-Roman tradition, though without usually copying cult practices. (For details, see Interpretatio graeca.)   Syncretic gods of the Hellenistic period also found wide favor in Rome: for example, Serapis, Isis and Mithras. Cybele as worshipped in Rome essentially represented a syncretic East Mediterranean goddess.  The Romans imported the Greek god Dionysus into Rome, where he merged with the Latin mead god Liber, and converted the Anatolian Sabazios into the Roman Sabazius.

The degree of correspondence varied: Jupiter makes perhaps a better match for Zeus than the rural huntress Diana does for the feared Artemis. Ares does not quite match Mars. The Romans physically imported the Anatolian goddess Cybele into Rome from her Anatolian cult-center Pessinos in the form of her original aniconic archaic stone idol; they identified her as Magna Mater and gave her a matronly, iconic image developed in Hellenistic Pergamum.

Likewise, when the Romans encountered Celts and Germanic peoples, they mingled these peoples' gods with their own, creating Sulis Minerva, Apollo Sucellos (Apollo the Good Smiter) and Mars Thingsus (Mars of the war-assembly), among many others.  In the Germania, the Roman historian Tacitus speaks of Germanic worshippers of Hercules and Mercury; most modern scholars tentatively identify Hercules as Thor and Mercury as Odin.

Romans were familiar with the concept of syncretism because from their earliest times they had experienced it with, among others, the Greeks. The Romans incorporated the originally Greek Apollo and Hercules into their religion. They did not look at the religious aspects that they adopted from other cultures to be different or less meaningful from religious aspects that were Roman in origin. The early Roman acceptance of other cultures religions into their own made it easy for them to integrate the newly encountered religions they found as a result of their expansion.

Early Christianity 
Gnosticism is identified as an early form of syncretism that challenged the beliefs of early Christians. Gnostic dualism posited that only spiritual or invisible things were good, and that material or visible things were evil. Orthodox (mainstream) Christians have always insisted that matter is essentially good, since, as they believe, God created all things, both spiritual and material, and said that it was "very good". Simon Magus has been identified as one of the early proponents of Gnosticism.

In the first few centuries after the death of Jesus, there were various competing "Jesus movements". The Roman emperors used syncretism to help unite the expanding empire. Social conversion to Christianity happened all over Europe. It became even more effective when missionaries concurred with established cultural traditions and interlaced them into a fundamentally Christian synthesis. Sometimes old pagan gods—or at least their aspects and roles—were transferred to Christian saints, such as when Demetrius of Thessaloniki inherited the role of patron of agriculture from Demeter and the Eleusinian Mysteries after the latter's demise in the 4th century.

Syncretism is distinguished from assimilation, the latter of which refers to the Church's ability to "incorporate into herself all that is true, good, and beautiful in the world." This idea was present in the early Church; the Second Apology of Justin Martyr states: "Whatever things were rightly said among all men, are the property of us Christians". The Church has assimilated many (though not all) of the ideas of Plato and Aristotle. Augustine of Hippo is remembered for assimilating the ideas of Plato, while Thomas Aquinas is known for doing so with the ideas of Aristotle. In his essay on the development of Christian doctrine, John Henry Newman clarified the idea of assimilation.

Early Judaism 

In Moses and Monotheism, Sigmund Freud made a case for Judaism arising out of the pre-existing monotheism that was briefly imposed upon Egypt during the rule of Akhenaten. The Code of Hammurabi is also cited as a likely starting point for the Jewish Ten Commandments. Some scholars hold that Judaism refined its concept of monotheism and adopted features such as its eschatology, angelology and demonology through contacts with Zoroastrianism. However, this is highly disputed among scholars

In spite of the Jewish halakhic prohibitions on polytheism, idolatry, and associated practices (Avodah Zarah), several combinations of Judaism with other religions have sprung up: Messianic Judaism, Jewish Buddhism, Nazarenism and Judeo-Paganism. Several  Jewish Messiah claimants (such as Jacob Frank) and the Sabbateans came to mix Kabbalistic Judaism with Christianity and Islam.

Post-classical history

Islam and West Asian religions

The Islamic mystical tradition known as Sufism appears somewhat syncretic in nature in its origins, but it is rejected by many other modern scholars. A better explanation is that,

Mainstream Tasawwuf does not present itself as a separate set of beliefs from the mainstream Sunni tradition; well-established traditions like Naqshbandi, Qadiri, Shadhili, and most others have always been part and parcel of normative Islamic life. No doubt some groups in the name of Sufism, just like in any religion, do espouse theologically unorthodox positions.

During Sufi presence in Bengal, Muslim–Hindu syncretism was a general trend, and Nabibangsha by Syed Sultan is an example of it. The book tells the lineage of the prophets of Islam. Apart from Adam, Noah, Abraham, Moses, and Jesus Christ, the poet also describes Indian deities such as Brahma, Vishnu, Rama and Krishna.

The Barghawata kingdom of Morocco followed a syncretic religion inspired by Islam (perhaps influenced by Judaism) with elements of Sunni, Shi'ite and Kharijite Islam, mixed with astrological and heathen traditions. Supposedly, they had their own Qur'an in the Berber language comprising 80 suras under the leadership of the second ruler of the dynasty Salih ibn Tarif who had taken part in the Maysara uprising. He proclaimed himself a prophet. He also claimed to be the final Mahdi of Islamic tradition, and that Isa (Jesus) would be his companion and pray behind him.

The Druzes integrated elements of Ismaili Islam with Gnosticism and Platonism. Satpanth is considered a syncretism of Ismaili Islam and Hinduism.

South and East Asian religions 

Buddhism has syncretized with many traditional beliefs in East Asian societies as it was seen as compatible with local religions. Notable syncretization of Buddhism with local beliefs includes the Three Teachings, or Triple Religion, that harmonizes Mahayana Buddhism with Confucian philosophy and elements of Taoism, and Shinbutsu-shūgō, which is a syncretism of Shinto and Buddhism. The religious beliefs, practices, and identities of East Asians (who comprise the majority of the world's Buddhists by any measure) often blend Buddhism with other traditions including Confucianism, the Chinese folk religion, Taoism, Shinto, Korean shamanism, Vietnamese folk religion. Before and during World War II, a Nichiren Shōshū priest named Jimon Ogasawara proposed the blending of Nichiren Buddhism with Shinto.

Hinduism, Buddhism, Jainism and Zoroastrianism in ancient India have made many adaptations over the millennia, assimilating elements of various religious traditions. One example of this is the Yoga Vasistha.

Akram Vigyan Movement established by Dada Bhagwan is considered to be a Jain-Vaishnava Hindu syncretistic movement.

The Mughal emperor Akbar, who wanted to consolidate the diverse religious communities in his empire, propounded Din-i-Ilahi, a syncretic religion intended to merge the best elements of the religions of his empire, Allopanishad is the example there. Satpanth is considered a syncretism of Ismaili Islam and Hinduism.

Meivazhi is a syncretic monotheistic minority religion based in Tamil Nadu, India. Its focus is spiritual enlightenment and the conquering of death, through the teachings. Mevaizhi preaches the Oneness of essence message of all the previous major scriptures – particularly Hinduism, Buddhism, Islam, Judaism and Christianity – allowing membership regardless of creed. Meivazhi's disciples are thousands of people belonging once to 69 different castes of different religions being united as one family of Meivazhi Religion.

In China, most of the population follows syncretist religions combining Mahayana Buddhism, Taoism and elements of Confucianism. Out of all Chinese believers, approximately 85.7% adhere to Chinese traditional religion, as many profess to be both Mahayana Buddhist and Taoist at the same time. Many of the pagodas in China are dedicated to both Buddhist and Taoist deities.

Likewise, in Southeast Asia, the local variants of Buddhism have been adapted to accommodate folk beliefs, such as the veneration of nats in Myanmar and phi in Thailand. Tibetan Buddhism is also syncretic in adopting practices from the earlier Bön religion.

The traditional Mun faith of the Lepcha people predates their seventh century conversion to Lamaistic Buddhism. Since that time, the Lepcha have practiced it together with Buddhism. Since the arrival of Christian missionaries in the nineteenth century, Mun traditions have been followed alongside that faith as well. The traditional religion permits the incorporation of Buddha and Jesus Christ as deities, depending on household beliefs.

Modern history

Christianity

One can contrast Christian syncretism with contextualization or inculturation, the practice of making Christianity relevant to a culture:  Contextualisation does not address the doctrine but affects a change in the styles or expression of worship. Although Christians often took their European music and building styles into churches in other parts of the world, in a contextualization approach, they would build churches, sing songs, and pray in a local ethnic style.  Some Jesuit missionaries adapted local systems and images to teach Christianity, as did the Portuguese in China, the practice of which was opposed by the Dominicans, leading to the Chinese rites controversy.

Protestant Reformation
Syncretism did not play a role when Christianity split into eastern and western rites during the Great Schism. It became involved, however, with the rifts of the Protestant Reformation, with Desiderius Erasmus's readings of Plutarch. Even earlier, syncretism was a fundamental aspect of the efforts of Neoplatonists such as Marsilio Ficino to reform the teachings of the Roman Catholic Church. In 1615, David Pareus of Heidelberg urged Christians to a "pious syncretism" in opposing the Antichrist, but few 17th-century Protestants discussed the compromises that might effect a reconciliation with the Catholic Church: Johann Hülsemann, Johann Georg Dorsche, and Abraham Calovius (1612–85) opposed the Lutheran Georg Calisen "Calixtus" (1586–1656) of the University of Helmstedt for his "syncretism". (See: Syncretistic controversy.)

New World

Catholicism in Central and South America has been integrated with a number of elements derived from indigenous and slave cultures in those areas (see the Caribbean and modern sections); while many African Initiated Churches demonstrate an integration of Protestant and traditional African beliefs. The Catholic Church allows some symbols and traditions to be carried over from older belief systems, so long as they are remade to conform (rather than conflict) with a Christian worldview; syncretism of other religions with the Catholic faith, such as Voudun or Santería, is expressly condemned by the Roman Catholic Church. The image of Our Lady of Guadalupe and the subsequent devotion to her are seen as assimilating some elements of native Mexican culture into Christianity. Santa Muerte, a female deity of death, has also emerged as the combination of the indigenous goddess Mictecacihuatl and the Lady of Guadalupe. As of 2012, Santa Muerte is worshipped by approximately 5% of the Mexican population, and also has a following in the United States and parts of Central America.

Some Andean areas, such as in Peru, have a strong influence of Inca-originated Quechua culture into Catholicism. This often results in Catholic holy days and festivities featuring Quechua dances or figures, such as the Assumption of Mary celebration in Chinchaypujio, or the fertility celebrations for Pachamama in the mostly Catholic Callalli.

The Lutheran Church–Missouri Synod experienced controversy for disciplining pastors for unionism and syncretism when they participated in multi-faith services in response to the 9/11 attacks and to the shootings at Newtown, Connecticut, on the grounds that joint worship with other Christian denominations or other religious faiths implied that differences between religions are not important.

In the Latter Day Saint movement, doctrine from previous dispensations as recorded in the LDS canon are considered official, though it is accepted that ancient teachings can be warped, misunderstood, or lost as a result of apostasy. While it does not officially recognize doctrine from other religions, it is believed that truth in other sources can be identified via personal revelation.

The Lacandon people of Central America acknowledge Äkyantho', the god of foreigners. He has a son named Hesuklistos (Jesus Christ) who is supposed to be the god of the foreigners. They recognize that Hesuklistos is a god but do not feel he is worthy of worship as he is a minor god.

East Asia
Catholicism in South Korea has been syncretized with traditional Mahayana Buddhist and Confucian customs that form an integral part of traditional Korean culture. As a result, South Korean Catholics continue to practice a modified form of ancestral rites and observe many Buddhist and Confucian customs and philosophies. In Asia the revolutionary movements of Taiping (19th-century China) and God's Army (Karen in the 1990s) blended Christianity with traditional beliefs.

Mongolia
Khotons follow a syncretic form of Islam that incorporates Buddhist and traditional elements (like Tengrism).

Italy
In Italy, especially within the Mezzogiorno, there is a syncretic Folk Catholic tradition known as Benedicaria. The origins of Benedicaria are not well known however, it could have potentially risen from the mixture between the forms of Roman Catholicism practiced by the common people and ancient Italian folk practices. Despite it being separated from mainstream Catholicism, followers still consider themselves to be devout Catholics.

Hinduism and Islam

Punjab 
Census reports taken in Punjab Province during the colonial era (British India) noted and documented various practices highlighting religious syncretism among Punjabi Muslims, Punjabi Hindus, and Meo Muslims.

Bengal 

Similar to that of Punjab, census reports conducted in British India highlighted syncretic practices among Bengali Hindus and Muslims.

In the Sundarbans (spread across Indian state of West Bengal and Bangladesh), it is noted that Bonbibi, a guardian spirit of the forests is venerated by Hindus and Muslim residents alike. In most of the shrines of Banbibi in the Sundarbans, Banbibi is most commonly worshipped along with her brother Shah Jangali and Dakkhin Rai.

Bauls are a group of mynstric minstrels who put emphasis on their mystical elements with the tradition of music. Baul tradition is essentially an amalgamation of Vaishnavism and Sufism. Baul has had a considerable effect on Bengali culture. Baul traditions are included in the list of Masterpieces of the Oral and Intangible Heritage of Humanity.

Baháʼí  Faith

The Baháʼís follow Bahá'u'lláh, a prophet whom they consider a successor to Muhammad, Jesus, Moses, Buddha, Zoroaster, Krishna and Abraham.  This acceptance of other religious founders has encouraged some to regard the Baháʼí religion as a syncretic faith.  However, Baháʼís and the Baháʼí literature explicitly reject this view.  Baháʼís consider Bahá'u'lláh's revelation an independent, though related, revelation from God.  Its relationship to previous dispensations is seen as analogous to the relationship of Christianity to Judaism.  They regard beliefs held in common as evidence of truth, progressively revealed by God throughout human history, and culminating in (at present) the Baháʼí revelation.  Baháʼís have their own sacred scripture, interpretations, laws and practices that, for Baháʼís, supersede those of other faiths.

Caribbean and Afro-American 
The process of syncretism in the Caribbean region often forms a part of cultural creolization. (The technical term "Creole" may apply to anyone born and raised in the region, regardless of race.) The shared histories of the Caribbean islands include long periods of European Imperialism (mainly by Spain, France, and Great Britain) and the importation of African slaves (primarily from Central and Western Africa). The influences of each of the above interacted in varying degrees on the islands, producing the fabric of society that exists today in the Caribbean.

The Rastafari movement, founded in Jamaica, syncretizes vigorously, mixing elements from the Bible, Marcus Garvey's Pan-Africanism movement, a text from the European grimoire tradition, the Sixth and Seventh Books of Moses, Hinduism, and Caribbean culture.

Another highly syncretic religion of the area, vodou, combines elements of Western African, native Caribbean, and Christian (especially Roman Catholic) beliefs.

Recently developed religious systems that exhibit marked syncretism include the African diasporic religions Candomblé, Vodou and Santería, which analogize various Yorùbá and other African deities to the Roman Catholic saints. Some sects of Candomblé have also incorporated Native American deities, and Umbanda combined African deities with Kardecist spiritualism.

Hoodoo is a similarly derived form of folk magic practiced by some African American communities in the Southern United States. Other traditions of syncretic folk religion in North America include Louisiana Voodoo as well as Pennsylvania Dutch Pow-wow, in which practitioners invoke power through the Christian God.

Other

Omnism is the belief in all religions with their gods.

Many historical Native American religious movements have incorporated Christian European influence, like the Native American Church, that teaches a combination of traditional Native American beliefs and Christianity, with sacramental use of the entheogen peyote. Further examples in North America are the Ghost Dance, and the religion of Handsome Lake.

Santo Daime is a syncretic religion founded in Brazil that incorporates elements of several religious or spiritual traditions including Folk Catholicism, Kardecist Spiritism, African animism and indigenous South American shamanism, including vegetalismo.

Unitarian Universalism also provides an example of a modern syncretic religion. It traces its roots to Universalist and Unitarian Christian congregations. However, modern Unitarian Universalism freely incorporates elements from other religious and non-religious traditions, so that it no longer identifies as "Christian."

The Theosophical Society professes to go beyond being a syncretic movement that combines deities into an elaborate Spiritual Hierarchy, and assembles evidence that points to an underlying (or occult) reality of Being that is universal and interconnected, common to all spirit-matter dualities. It is maintained that this is the source of religious belief, each religion simply casting that one reality through the prism of that particular time and in a way that is meaningful to their circumstances.

Universal Sufism seeks the unity of all people and religions. Universal Sufis strive to "realize and spread the knowledge of Unity, the religion of Love, and Wisdom, so that the biases and prejudices of faiths and beliefs may, of themselves, fall away, the human heart overflow with love, and all hatred caused by distinctions and differences be rooted out."

In Vietnam, Caodaism blends elements of Buddhism, Catholicism and Taoism.

Several Japanese new religions, such as Konkokyo and Seicho-No-Ie, are syncretistic.

The Nigerian religion Chrislam combines Christian and Islamic doctrines.

In West-Central Africa, modern Bwiti incorporates animism, ancestor worship, ritual use of iboga, and Christianity into a syncretistic belief system.

Thelema is a mixture of many different schools of belief and practice, including Hermeticism, Eastern Mysticism, Yoga, 19th century libertarian philosophies (i.e. Nietzsche), occultism, and the Kabbalah, as well as ancient Egyptian and Greek religion.

Examples of strongly syncretist Romantic and modern movements with some religious elements include mysticism, occultism, Theosophical Society, modern astrology, Neopaganism, and the New Age movement.

In Réunion, the Malbars combine elements of Hinduism and Christianity.

The Unification Church, founded by religious leader Sun Myung Moon in South Korea in 1954. Its teachings are based on the Bible, but include new interpretations not found in mainstream Judaism and Christianity and incorporates East Asian traditions.

See also
 Inclusivism
 Sheilaism
 Folk religion
 Interfaith dialogue
 Religious pluralism
 Religious toleration
 New religious movement
 Multiple religious belonging 
 Polytheism
 Creolization
 Afro-Brazilian religion
 Candomblé
 Umbanda
 Folk saints
 Afro-American religions

References

Literature
Anita Maria Leopold, Jeppe Sinding Jensen,  Syncretism in Religion: A Reader, Routledge (2016).
Eric Maroney, SCM Core Text: Religious Syncretism, SCM Press (2006)